T68 may refer to:

AnsaldoBreda T-68, former tram in Manchester, England
International medical code for Hypothermia
INS Baratang, Indian Navy vessel with the pennant T68
Sony Ericsson T68, mobile phone